Catherine Breillat (born 13 July 1948) is a French filmmaker, novelist and professor of auteur cinema at the European Graduate School. In the film business for over 40 years, Catherine Breillat chooses to normalize previously taboo subjects in cinema. Taking advantage of the medium of cinema, Breillat juxtaposes different perspectives to highlight irony found in society.

Life and career
Breillat was born in Bressuire, Deux-Sèvres, but grew up in Niort. She decided to become a writer and director at the age of twelve after watching Ingmar Bergman's Gycklarnas afton, believing she had found her "fictional body" in Harriet Andersson's character, Anna.

She started her career after studying acting at Yves Furet's "Studio d'Entraînement de l'Acteur" in Paris together with her sister, actress Marie-Hélène Breillat (born 2 June 1947) in 1967. At the age of 17, she had her novel published, l'Homme facile (A Man for the Asking). The French government banned it for readers under 18 years old. A film based on the novel was made shortly after the publication of the book, but the producer went bankrupt and the distributor Artedis blocked any commercial release of the film for twenty years although it had been given an R rating.

Breillat is known for films focusing on sexuality, intimacy, gender conflict, and sibling rivalry. Breillat has been the subject of controversy for her explicit depictions of sexuality and violence. She cast the porn actor Rocco Siffredi in her films Romance (Romance X, 1999) and Anatomie de l'enfer (Anatomy of Hell, 2004). Her novels have been best-sellers.

Her work has been associated with the cinéma du corps/cinema of the body genre. In an interview with Senses of Cinema, she described David Cronenberg as another filmmaker she considers to have a similar approach to sexuality in film.

Though Breillat spends most of her time behind the camera, she has acted in a handful of movies. She made her film debut in Bernardo Bertolucci's Last Tango in Paris (1972) as Mouchette, a dressmaker, alongside her sister Marie-Hélène Breillat.

In 2004, Breillat suffered a cerebral hemorrhage, causing a stroke that paralyzed her left side. After five months of hospitalization and a slow rehabilitation, she gradually returned to work, producing Une vieille maîtresse (The Last Mistress) in 2007.  This film was one of three French films officially selected for the Cannes Film Festival of that year.

In 2007, Breillat met notorious conman Christophe Rocancourt, and offered him a leading role in a movie that she was planning to make, based on her own novel Bad Love, and starring Naomi Campbell.  Soon after, she gave him €25,000 to write a screenplay titled La vie amoureuse de Christophe Rocancourt (The Love Life of Christophe Rocancourt), and over the next year and a half, gave him loans totalling an additional €678,000. In 2009, a book written by Breillat was published, in which she alleged that Rocancourt had taken advantage of her diminished mental capacity, as she was still recovering from her stroke. The book is titled Abus de faiblesse, a French legal term usually translated as "abuse of weakness". In 2012, Rocancourt was convicted of abus de faiblesse for taking Breillat's money, and sentenced to prison.

In September 2010, Breillat's second fairy-tale based film, La belle endormie (Sleeping Beauty), opened in the Orizzonti sidebar in the 67th Venice Film Festival.

, although Breillat had moved on to other projects, she still hoped to film Bad Love, but had not yet been able to find financing to do so. However, a film adaptation of her book Abus de faiblesse, directed by Breillat and starring Isabelle Huppert, began production in 2012, and was screened at the 2013 Toronto International Film Festival.

It has been noted that "Breillat remains committed to the long take, particularly during scenes of sexual negotiation, a technique that showcases her performers' virtuosity as well as emphasizes the political and philosophical elements of sex. In both Fat Girl and Romance, for example, key sex scenes possess shots lasting over seven minutes."

in 2018, Breillat made controversial remarks on Asia Argento, who starred in 2007's The Last Mistress, calling Argento a "traitor" for accusing Harvey Weinstein of sexual assault.

Common themes in Breillat's films 
Through film, Breillat attempts to redefine the female narrative in cinema by showing female characters who undergo similar experiences as their male counterparts. Many of Breillat's films explore the transition between girlhood and adulthood. The females of her films attempt to escape their adolescence by seeking individuality. There is an unsaid silence in society for girls to hide their sexuality and desires unless directly confronted about them. Breillat offers a platform to discuss female pleasure and sexual responsibility by exposing social and sexual conflicts in her films' themes.

Works

Filmography

Stage plays
 Les Vêtements de mer

Bibliography

 Abus de faiblesse
 Pornocratie
 Le Soupirail
 L'homme facile
 Tapage Nocturne

References

Further reading
 Anne-Élisabeth Blateau, « Une vieille maîtresse sans Breillat » (A Last Mistress without Breillat), in Carré d'Art by Jean-Pierre Thiollet, Anagramme, Paris, 2008 (pp. 143–149).
 Douglas Keesey, Catherine Breillat, Manchester University Press, coll. « French film directors », 2009.

External links
 Catherine Breillat Faculty Page at European Graduate School (Biography, bibliography, lectures and videos)
 
Catherine Breillat bibliography via UC Berkeley Media Resources Center
A Salon interview with Catherine Breillat
Salon review of "Romance"
indiewire review of "Romance"
 Rewriting Fairy Tales, Revisiting Female Identity: An Interview with Catherine Breillat, Maria Garcia, Cineaste, Summer 2011

1948 births
Commandeurs of the Ordre des Arts et des Lettres
Feminist filmmakers
French expatriates in Switzerland
French film directors
French-language film directors
20th-century French screenwriters
21st-century French screenwriters
French women film directors
French women novelists
French women screenwriters
Academic staff of European Graduate School
Living people
People from Bressuire